Tim Alfa Coronel (born 5 April 1972, in Naarden) is a Dutch racing driver. He is the twin brother of World Touring Car Championship driver Tom Coronel.

Racing career
Tim made his first steps in racing by winning the Dutch Citroën AX Cup in 1994 as a 22-year-old. He followed this with a move into single-seaters finishing seventh and then fifth in two years in the Formula Opel Eurocup. In 1997 he raced in German F3. He moved to Touring Cars in 1998 racing a Mitsubishi Carisma in the Dutch Championship, in which he finished eleventh, then sixth and then third over three years. He raced a Lexus IS200 in 2001, finishing fifth, and finished fourth in a Renault Clio in 2002. He won the Dutch Alfa Romeo 147 Challenge in 2003 and the Dutch Porsche GT3 Cup in 2005. Between 2006 and 2008 he raced in the Dutch BMW 130i Cup, before moving onto the SEAT León Eurocup for 2009. At the opening round at Valencia he finished third and fourth in the two races, making him the top scorer of the weekend, meaning he won a one-off drive in a SEAT León TFSI for SUNRED Engineering at the next round of the World Touring Car Championship (which the SEAT León Eurocup supports) at Brno. SUNRED Engineering is also the team that his twin brother Tom drives for in the WTCC.

In January 2009 Tim and Tom Coronel competed in the Dakar Rally in a Bowler Nemesis. He competed again in the 2010 and 2011 Dakar rally in a McRae Buggy and won the solo-class both times. In 2012 Tim made his 5th appearance in the Dakar Rally, again with the McRae Buggy, after plans for a full electrical version of Buggy turned out to be too ambitious.

Racing record

Complete World Touring Car Championship results
(key) (Races in bold indicate pole position) (Races in italics indicate fastest lap)

Dakar Rally results

References

External links
  
 
Tim´s Dakar Team

1972 births
Living people
People from Naarden
Dutch Sephardi Jews
Jewish Dutch sportspeople
Dutch racing drivers
German Formula Three Championship drivers
World Touring Car Championship drivers
SEAT León Eurocup drivers
Eurocup Mégane Trophy drivers
Twin sportspeople
Dutch twins
Dakar Rally drivers
24H Series drivers
Sportspeople from North Holland
TDS Racing drivers
Van Amersfoort Racing drivers
GT4 European Series drivers
Engstler Motorsport drivers